John Farrelly is an Irish writer, director, and producer best known for An Taibhse, The Sleep Experiment and Choice (Short Film).

Early life
John was born in Drogheda, Ireland in 2000.

Career
John was awarded Ireland's Best Young Film-maker in 2018 for his short film Choice. John is set to release his debut feature film The Sleep Experiment' in 2022.

Filmography

Feature films

Short films

Awards and nominations

References

External links
 

21st-century Irish people
Irish film directors
Irish film producers
Living people
People from Drogheda
2000 births